Richard James is a bespoke Savile Row tailors and contemporary menswear company. It was founded in 1992 by designer Richard James, a graduate of Brighton College of Art and a former buyer for the London boutique Browns, and his business partner Sean Dixon. Richard James has won both the British Fashion Council's Menswear Designer of the Year and Bespoke Designer of the Year awards.

History
The first of the "new establishment" or "new bespoke movement" of Savile Row - the new, more fashion orientated wave of tailors who moved onto the street in the nineties - Richard James is widely credited as having done much to revitalise the reputation and fortunes of what is acknowledged to be the world centre of quality tailoring.

Richard James's trademark slim, modern tailoring and bold use of colour have earned it a large celebrity following. Mark Ronson,  Daniel Craig, David Beckham, Tinie Tempah, Mo Farah, David Cameron, P Diddy, Jude Law, Tom Cruise, Benicio del Toro, Bryan Ferry, Christian Lacroix, Sir Elton John, Hugh Grant, Manolo Blahnik, Pierce Brosnan, Sir Mick Jagger and Sir Paul McCartney number amongst the company's customers.

Richard James is a founding member of the Savile Row Bespoke Association, the trade organisation that represents bespoke tailoring on Savile Row, but Richard James' fashion led approach, marketing techniques and introduction of Saturday opening to Savile Row was initially met with concern by some of the street's established tailors.

One early supporter of Richard James, however, was established British couturier Hardy Amies who had opened his business on Savile Row in 1946. "Sir Hardy Amies was marvellous," recalled James. "I well recall his chauffeur-driven car pulling up outside Richard James and Sir Hardy emerging like Lady Bracknell. He'd cast a lugubrious eye over the bright pink and acid green jackets in our window before shaking his head at us in mock disbelief. And then he smiled."

Richard James now has two shops on Savile Row, one of which is devoted to bespoke tailoring, and a flagship store in New York. Bespoke suits start at £4,500 inclusive of VAT. The company's ready-to-wear collections are also sold worldwide through stockists such as Harrods, Selfridges, Bloomingdales, Barneys New York and Lane Crawford.

House Style
Richard James's tailoring has always centred on what has become known in the style press as its 'modern classic' style: one or two-button single-breasted suits with slightly longer, more waisted jackets, incorporating deep side vents and a slightly higher armhole to give a slim, definitive silhouette.
The overall design philosophy is to produce classic clothing, but to push the barriers through experimenting with fabrics and making bold use of pattern and, particularly, colour. The British fashion writer and academic Colin McDowell has described James as being 'the best colourist working in menswear in London today'.

Collaborations

Throughout its history, Richard James has collaborated on a number of high-profile projects with a diverse number of companies and individuals, including SpongeBob SquarePants, Elton John, Spencer Tunick (picture, right),  Condor Cycles, Umbro and Tretorn.

Timeline
1992
The first Richard James shop opens at 37a Savile Row.
Richard James's arrival is noticed by Nick Sullivan in British Esquire magazine: "There is an odd atmosphere these days in Savile Row. Nothing tangible, you understand. But from time to time, people stop to peer with uncertainty, with incomprehension, even with vague horror through the plate glass window of No. 37a. There's a new boy on The Row and he's causing quite a stir."

1995
The Sunday Telegraph reveals that Queen Elizabeth II's cousin David Linley is measured for his Richard James suits astride his motorcycle. Richard James moves to new, 2,000 square feet premises at 31 Savile Row.
1996
Richard James's 'suicide' cinema advertisement, which shows a Richard James attired man throwing himself off the top of a building, is banned.

1996
Richard James is awarded the Evening Standard's Eros Award as Retailer of the Year. Richard James is profiled in a feature on cutting edge British design and style in the defining Cool Britannia edition of Vanity Fair.

1998'
Dustin Hoffman and Robert De Niro wear Richard James camouflage suits on the cover of George (magazine).

2000
Richard James moves to 29 Savile Row, the largest premises on the street, which becomes its flagship shop, design studio and showroom.

2001
Richard James receives the Menswear Designer of the Year award from the British Fashion Council and the Designer of the Year award at the British GQ Men of the Year awards. Richard James supplies all the suits for its customer Hugh Grant's wardrobe in Bridget Jones's Diary (film).

2004
Richard James launches its trainers in conjunction with Tretorn.
Richard James is one of the founding members of the Savile Row Bespoke Association, which is formed to promote and protect the traditions of bespoke tailoring on Savile Row.

2007
Richard James opens another shop, Richard James Bespoke, opposite its Savile Row flagship shop, which is dedicated to bespoke tailoring.

2008
Richard James wins Best Advertising Campaign for Autumn/Winter '07 at the Wallpaper (magazine) Magazine Design Awards.
Richard James is the inaugural winner of the Bespoke Designer of the Year award at the British Fashion Council Awards.

2010
Richard James launches Mayfair, its contemporary entry level line, which is made available through John Lewis (department store) in the UK and Barneys New York in the USA.

2011
Richard James enters ecommerce with the launch of its global online shop.
Richard James launches a capsule collection in collaboration with SpongeBob SquarePants.
In conjunction with Swarovski, Richard James produces the wardrobe for Sir Elton John's The Million Dollar Piano shows at Caesars Palace in Las Vegas.

2012
Richard James celebrates its twentieth birthday.
Richard James shows its Spring/Summer '13 collection at London Collections: Men, the British Fashion Council's inaugural menswear-specific fashion week.

2013
Richard James shows its Autumn/Winter '13 collection at the second London Collections:Men in January. The refurbished flagship store at 29 Savile Row is unveiled in November.

2014
Richard James shows its Autumn/Winter '14 and Spring/Summer '15 collections at London Collections: Men and launches its new, significantly larger online store. Richard James Savile Row eau de toilette is relaunched.

2015
Richard James shows its Autumn/Winter '15 and Spring/Summer '16 collections at London Collections: Men.

2016 
Richard James show its Autumn/Winter '16 and Spring/Summer '17 collections at London Collections:Men.

2017 
Richard James unveils its Autumn/Winter '17 Camofleur collection in January during London Fashion Week Men's. Real estate developer and film producer Charles S. Cohen takes a majority stake in Richard James and assumes the role of chairman. Richard James Bespoke expands upstairs at 19 Clifford Street and now 
boasts two floors and 150 m2 devoted to bespoke and made-to-measure tailoring.

2018
Richard James the man is made an OBE (Order of the British Empire) in the New Year Honours list for services to fashion. Richard James crosses the Atlantic and opens its first New York store at 461 Park Avenue.

2019
To celebrate the release of the Elton John biopic Rocketman (film), Richard James displays some of the special pieces it has made for the star at its Savile Row and Park Avenue, New York stores.

2020
All-round changes at the top as Richard James the man steps back from a full-time role on Savile Row and, to much interest, puts his Mayfair penthouse on the market.

2021
The Savile Row store's art programme is inaugurated with an exhibition by Jamie Fitzpatrick.

References

British fashion designers
British suit makers
Clothing companies based in London
Menswear designers
Savile Row Bespoke Association members
Clothing companies established in 1992
Retail companies established in 1992
1992 establishments in England
Clothing companies of England